House of Representatives is the second album from the popular Christian hip hop group the Cross Movement, released on February 18, 1999. The Cross Movement on this album consisted of The Ambassador, Cruz Cordero, EarthQuake, Enock, Phanatik, Tru-Life and Tonic.

Music video
A music video was made for the song "House of Representatives".

Track listing
Welcome
House of Representatives
Introducin’
It or a Thing (Interlude)
Playa Hater #1
Human Superstars
Eyes Off Me
I Am That I Am
Spare Rituals
Off the Hook
Not On Stage (Interlude)
Just 4 You
Maze of the Madness
Know Your God (Interlude)
The Way
Rescue
Think On These Things
Cypha the Next Day
Word Up

Citations 

1998 albums
The Cross Movement albums
Cross Movement Records albums